Lockey is a surname. Notable people with the surname include:

 Charles Lockey (1820-1901), English singer
 Justin Lockey (born 1980), British musician 
 Rowland Lockey (1565-1616), English painter and goldsmith
 Thomas Lockey (c. 1602–1679), English librarian and Anglican priest
 Tilly Lockey (born 2005), British amputee